Tomoxia carinata is a species of beetle in the genus Tomoxia of the family Mordellidae. It was described by Smith in 1883.

References

Beetles described in 1883
Tomoxia